May 31 - Eastern Orthodox Church calendar - June 2

All fixed commemorations below celebrated on June 14 by Orthodox Churches on the Old Calendar.

For June 1st, Orthodox Churches on the Old Calendar commemorate the Saints listed on May 19.

Saints
 Martyr Justin the Philosopher (Justin Martyr) at Rome (166)
 Martyrs Chariton, Charita, Euelpistus, Hierax, Peonus, Valerian (Liberianus), and Justus with Justin Martyr (166)
 Martyr Neon, by beheading.
 Saint Pyrrus, Bishop, reposed in peace. 
 Martyr Thespesius of Cappadocia (222)
 Martyrs Ischyrion, a military officer, and five other soldiers, in Egypt (250)
 The holy Ten thousand Martyrs, in Antiochia (249-251)
 Martyr Firmus, under the eparch Magus (299)
 Martyr Gerasimos.
 St. Metrius the Farmer of Myra in Lycia (912)

Pre-Schism Western saints
 Martyrs Felinus and Gratinianus (250)
 Hieromartyrs Reverianus (Bishop) and Paul (priest), with ten others, at Autun (272)
 Martyr Crescentian, in Saldo near Città di Castello in Italy (287)
 Martyr Juventius, in Rome.
 Martyr Proclus, at Bologna (304)
 Martyr Secundus, At Amelia in Umbria, when thrown into the Tiber (304)
 Martyr Clarus of Acquitaine, a Bishop believed to have been sent to evangelize Aquitaine, France.
 Saint Fortunatus of Spoleto the Wonderworker (400)
 Saint Caprasius of Lérins, Abbot (430)
 Saint Ronan of Locronan (Ronan of Cornouaille (Cornwall)), an early bishop who preached in Cornouaille in Brittany (6th century)
 Saint Wite, a female Dorset saint martyred by the Danes, buried at Whitchurch Canonicorum (c. 831).
 Saint Wigstan (Wystan, Wistan, Winston), of the royal house of Mercia in England (849)
 Saint Gaudentius of Ossero, Bishop of Ossero in Istria (1044)
 Saint Atto, a monk at Oña in Spain with St. Enneco, who later became Bishop of Oca-Valpuesta (c. 1044)

Post-Schism Orthodox saints
 Saint Agapetus of the Kiev Caves, Unmercenary physician of the Kiev Near Caves (1095)
 Dionysius of Glushetsk in Vologda, Abbot, Wonderworker (1437)
 Martyr Shio the New (Shio of Akhakalakhi) in Georgia (1696)
 Synaxis of the Holy Martyrs of Georgia: David, Gabriel, and Paul of the St. David Gareji Monastery (1696-1700)
 Saint Justin (Popovic), Archimandrite of Ćelije Monastery in Serbia (1979)

New martyrs and confessors
 New Hieromartyr Onuphrius (Gagalyuk), Bishop of Kharkov (1938)
 New Hieromartyr Basil, priest, Virgin-martyr Vera Samsonov (1940).

Other commemorations
 Commemoration of the deliverance of the island of Lefkada from the plague through the intercession of Saint Bessarion (†1540), Archbishop of Larissa (c. 1743)
 Repose of Elder Philaret of Kapsala, Mount Athos (1975).
 Glorification (1990) of Righteous John of Kronstadt (1908)

Icon gallery

Notes

References

Sources 
 June 1/14. Orthodox Calendar (PRAVOSLAVIE.RU).
 June 14 / June 1. HOLY TRINITY RUSSIAN ORTHODOX CHURCH (A parish of the Patriarchate of Moscow).
 June 1. OCA - The Lives of the Saints.
 The Autonomous Orthodox Metropolia of Western Europe and the Americas (ROCOR). St. Hilarion Calendar of Saints for the year of our Lord 2004. St. Hilarion Press (Austin, TX). p. 40.
 The First Day of the Month of June. Orthodoxy in China.
 June 1. Latin Saints of the Orthodox Patriarchate of Rome.
 The Roman Martyrology. Transl. by the Archbishop of Baltimore. Last Edition, According to the Copy Printed at Rome in 1914. Revised Edition, with the Imprimatur of His Eminence Cardinal Gibbons. Baltimore: John Murphy Company, 1916. pp. 159–160.
 Rev. Richard Stanton. A Menology of England and Wales, or, Brief Memorials of the Ancient British and English Saints Arranged According to the Calendar, Together with the Martyrs of the 16th and 17th Centuries. London: Burns & Oates, 1892. pp. 249–250.
Greek Sources
 Great Synaxaristes:  1 ΙΟΥΝΙΟΥ. ΜΕΓΑΣ ΣΥΝΑΞΑΡΙΣΤΗΣ.
  Συναξαριστής. 1 Ιουνίου. ECCLESIA.GR. (H ΕΚΚΛΗΣΙΑ ΤΗΣ ΕΛΛΑΔΟΣ). 
  01/06/2017. Ορθόδοξος Συναξαριστής. 
Russian Sources
  14 июня (1 июня). Православная Энциклопедия под редакцией Патриарха Московского и всея Руси Кирилла (электронная версия). (Orthodox Encyclopedia - Pravenc.ru).
  1 июня (ст.ст.) 14 июня 2013 (нов. ст.). Русская Православная Церковь Отдел внешних церковных связей. (DECR).
  1 июня по старому стилю / 14 июня по новому стилю. Русская Православная Церковь - Православный церковный календарь на 2016 год.

June in the Eastern Orthodox calendar